was a Japanese composer. He was also a lyricist, actor, and multi-tarento. He could also sing songs and advertisement songs.

Kobayashi was represented by Astro Music. He was the director of the Japan Songwriters Association (J-scat). Kobayashi served as the first president of the Dai Nihon Piman-sha Renmei (Dai Pi Ren). His songs are used in advertisements and television themes.

Asei also composed the music for the 1990 Famicom video game Niji no Silkroad. A soundtrack CD was later released titled Rainbow Silkroad Image Album WINDY ROAD. 

He also composed The TV Asahi song in 1977 when the television station changed its name to its current name.

Filmography

Anime

See also
Hideki Saijo
Kirin Kiki
MoJo
Kuniko Mukōda

References

External links
  
 
 Asei Kobayashi at Oricon 
 Asei Kobayashi

1932 births
2021 deaths
Anime composers
Japanese entertainers
Japanese film score composers
Japanese male actors
Japanese male film score composers
Japanese songwriters
Keio University alumni
Musicians from Tokyo